Webware may refer to:

 Web application, an application that is accessed with a Web browser over the World Wide Web
 Webware, a CNET News blog covering Web 2.0 topics